Hot roots is a term used by hair stylists to explain the condition brought about by applying an artificial pigment to the hair, whereby the roots (the sections of the hair follicles closest to the scalp) are noticeably warmer in color (more red/orange) than the ends of the hair.  This can happen for a few reasons, but the two most likely causes are explained below.
It is helpful to understand the general nature of the lightening, or "lifting", of natural hair color.  The color of natural hair is determined by the melanin present.  Generally, the more melanin, the darker the hair.  In order for the color of hair to be lightened, a chemical must penetrate the cuticle of the hair, enter the cortex and destroy the melanin.  Permanent hair color, bleach and other decolorants can do this to varying degrees.
Permanent hair color, unlike bleach and other decolorants, leaves behind an artificial pigment while destroying the natural pigment.  This pigment is a mix of the primary colors:  blue, red and yellow.  The chemical reaction that occurs within the hair follicle during a color-lightening process, in essence, destroys the natural melanin as well as the blue, red and yellow hues, respectively, one at a time.  The extent to which this occurs can be affected by the proportion of chemicals present, especially hydrogen peroxide, as well as by the temperature at which the hair is kept during the process.  Artificial hair pigment, unlike natural hair pigment, cannot be lightened to a noticeable extent by other artificial hair color.

After the hair is lightened (the natural hues are destroyed) to a sufficient level, the pigment within the artificial color will, ideally, in perfect blue-red-yellow balance, replace the recently destroyed natural pigment.  Often, hair that has been lightened will exhibit a redder or more orange tone than it did previously.  This is because there is not enough blue pigment present to visually balance the red and yellow pigmentation (both natural and artificial) that remains.  Understandably, hair color manufacturers elect to err on the side of turning hair a little too red, in the absence of enough blue, instead of possibly giving the hair a purple or blue tint, in the absence of enough yellow and/or red pigmentation (as might be the case when applied to grey or very light blonde hair).

Causes
The first way that hot roots can occur involves two separate color applications.  Once permanent hair color is applied and subsequent hair growth occurs, the roots of the affected hair can, and usually do, exhibit a noticeably different color from the ends.  To equalize the color of the roots and the ends, another artificial color can be applied to this new growth.  This is what is called a "color touch-up."  If this touch-up color is lighter and/or warmer than the original color applied, the roots can appear warmer, creating hot roots.  This will happen even if the touch-up color is applied from root to end because, as mentioned above, the newly applied artificial color will not lighten the artificial color already present on the ends, as it does the natural color at the roots.

Secondly, hot roots can be the result of a single color process.  If a darker shade of natural hair color is being lightened with a permanent hair color, the heat produced by the scalp can cause the hair nearest it to lighten more and/or become warmer than the ends of the hair.

References

Hairdressing
Hair color